Zhu Wu is a fictional character in Water Margin, one of the Four Great Classical Novels in Chinese literature. Nicknamed "Resourceful Strategist", he ranks 37th among the 108 Stars of Destiny and first among the 72 Earthly Fiends.

Background
Zhu Wu is depicted in the novel as handsome-looking with blazing eyes and a long sleek beard. Dressed like a Taoist priest and often carrying a hand fan made of crane feathers, Zhu Wu is good in devising military stratagems and deploying soldiers in formation for pitched battle. He is thus nicknamed "Resourceful Strategist".

Originally from Dingyuan (定遠; present-day Dingyuan County, Anhui), Zhu Wu leads a band of outlaws on Mount Shaohua (少華山; southeast of present-day Hua County, Shaanxi), assisted by Chen Da and Yang Chun. Whenever their food stock runs low, the three would go plunder the nearby counties and villages.

Befriending Shi Jin
One day Chen Da suggests raiding the quite well-stocked Huayin County for food. But Zhu Wu warns that the route would take him through the Shi Family Village where he might encounter Shi Jin, a formidable fighter. Unconvinced, Chen Da leads some men towards Huayin. 

Sure enough, Shi Jin blocks Chen Da's path with his village men and captures him in a one-on-one combat on horseback. Upon receiving the news, Yang Chun suggests a showdown with Shi. But Zhu Wu believes a psychological tactic might work. So the two go to the Shi Family Village where they ask Shi to arrest them so that they could die with Chen Da in keeping with their oath. Moved by their bond, Shi Jin frees Chen and befriends the three. Thenceforth, the two sides often exchange gifts and gather secretly for drink.

One day a hunter discovers a reply letter from the bandits accepting an invitation by Shi Jin to attend a festive gathering at his house. The matter is reported to the authorities, which send an arrest party to Shi's house on the night of the gathering. Finding his manor besieged, Shi Jin burns it down and fights his way out with the three bandit chiefs. At Mount Shaohua, Zhu Wu asks Shi to take over from him as chief, but the offer is turned down. However, Shi eventually comes to head the stronghold after he failed to find his teacher Wang Jin at Weizhou.

Joining Liangshan
Trying to save a woman abducted by Prefect He of Hua Prefecture (Huazhou), Shi Jin falls into the official's trap and is captured. Lu Zhishen, who comes to Mount Shaohua to invite Shi to join Liangshan, tries to rescue him but also falls into He's ambush. Zhu Wu, Chen Da and Yang Chun turn to Liangshan for help. Arriving at Huazhou, the Liangshan men lure He out of the city and kill him. After saving Shi Jin and Lu Zhishen, the Mount Shaohua bandits, including Zhu Wu, are absorbed into Liangshan.

Campaigns
Zhu Wu is appointed as assistant to Liangshan‘s top strategists Wu Yong and Gongsun Sheng after the 108 Stars of Destiny came together in what is called the Grand Assembly. He participates in the campaigns against the Liao invaders and rebel forces in Song territory following amnesty by Emperor Huizong for Liangshan. His astuteness in military matters helps Liangshan win several battles.

Zhu Wu is one of the few heroes who survive all the campaigns. When the survivors are returning to the imperial capital Dongjing in expectation of rewards, Zhu Wu decides to leave the group accompanied by Fan Rui to take up Taoist practice under Gongsun Sheng. He becomes a Taoist immortal, according to the novel.

References
 
 
 
 
 
 
 

72 Earthly Fiends
Fictional characters from Anhui